Pareuxoa lineifera is a moth of the family Noctuidae. It is found in Termas de Río Blanco in Chile and Neuquén in Argentina.

The wingspan is 30–32 mm. Adults are on wing in February.

External links
 Noctuinae of Chile

Noctuinae